J Glacier is located in Bridger-Teton National Forest, in the US state of Wyoming on the west of the Continental Divide in the Wind River Range. J Glacier is in the Bridger Wilderness, and is part of the largest grouping of glaciers in the American Rocky Mountains. J Glacier flows down from the northwest slope of Klondike Peak and a proglacial lake has formed at the toe of the glacier.

References

See also
 List of glaciers in the United States

Glaciers of Sublette County, Wyoming
Glaciers of Wyoming